Potassium voltage-gated channel subfamily G member 1 is a protein that in humans is encoded by the KCNG1 gene.

Voltage-gated potassium (Kv) channels represent the most complex class of voltage-gated ion channels from both functional and structural standpoints. Their diverse functions include regulating neurotransmitter release, heart rate, insulin secretion, neuronal excitability, epithelial electrolyte transport, smooth muscle contraction, and cell volume. This gene encodes a member of the potassium channel, voltage-gated, subfamily G. This gene is abundantly expressed in skeletal muscle. Alternative splicing results in at least two transcript variants encoding distinct isoforms.

See also
 Voltage-gated potassium channel

References

Further reading

External links 
 
 

Ion channels